Georg Niedermeier (born 26 February 1986) is a German former professional footballer who played as a defender. He came through the Bayern Munich's youth academy before joining VfB Stuttgart on loan in January 2009 and officially signing for them in February 2010 for €4 million.

Club career

Bayern Munich
Born in Munich, Niedermeier began his football career at SC Bogenhausen in a youth team before joining FC Bayern Munich at age 9, starting his way through the academy and reaching captaincy with the reserve team. He played for FC Bayern Munich's reserve team from 2003. At the age of 17 he debuted in his first seniors match, resulting in a 0–0 draw against FC Augsburg on 18 October. Whilst taking the step to the Seniors team, Niedermeier also helped the FC Bayern Munich U19s team win the U19s Youth Bundesliga Championship.

At the start of the 2008–09 season, Niedermeier was given the captain's armband in the opening game of the season against FC Union Berlin, with a 2–1 victory. Also in the same year, he became involved with the first team, making his professional debut. He was nominated for the squad of FC Bayern Munich for Bundesliga games against Hamburger SV and Borussia Dortmund in August 2008, and later against Olympique Lyonnais in the UEFA Champions League.

In January 2009, Niedermeier signed a new deal, keeping him at Bayern Munich until 2012.

VfB Stuttgart
On 30 January 2009, Niedermeier was loaned to VfB Stuttgart until June 2010, in order to gain first team experience. After the move, Niedermeier said that he had more opportunity to play here (Stuttgart).

On 1 March 2009, Niedermeier made his Stuttgart (and Bundesliga) debut as part of the starting XI, resulting in a 2–0 win against rival Karlsruher SC. However, during a 2–1 win against Borussia Dortmund on 7 March 2009, he suffered an ankle injury that kept him out for a month. On 9 May 2009, Niedermeier returned to the starting line–up, helping Stuttgart win 4–1 against, Wolfsburg, who would go on to become champions. With his five appearances for the side, in his first half season as a professional, he helped VfB Stuttgart finish 3rd after an incredible run in the second half of the season and qualified for the UEFA Champions League 2009-10.

In the 2009–10 season, Niedermeier scored his first goal of his Bundesliga career with a header, in a 1–1 draw at Signal Iduna Park against Borussia Dortmund on 28 August 2009. However, he found himself behind the pecking order in the first team, due to competitions from Serdar Tasci, Khalid Boulahrouz and Matthieu Delpierre. By November, Niedermeier started in the next three matches for the side following an injury of Tasci and Boulahrouz, including making his UEFA Champions League debut, which ended in a 2–0 win against Glasgow Rangers at Ibrox-Park on 24 November 2009. At the beginning of the second half of the season, he started the first four matches for the side, all of which were wins. Five days later on 11 February 2010, negotiations between Bayern Munich and VfB Stuttgart came to an end  - Niedermeier signed a 4-year deal keeping him in Stuttgart until June 2014. He made four more starts throughout March, including another UEFA Champions League appearance against FC Barcelona in the round of 16 second leg in Camp Nou. Manager Christian Gross praised his performance for his display of confidence. VfB Stuttgart finished 6th place in the league after having a good second half of the season once again - giving them the opportunity to take part in the UEFA Europa League the following season. At the end of the 2009–10 season, Niedermeier went on to make fourteen appearances, scoring once in all competitions, and losing only two matches.

At the start of the 2010–11 season, Niedermeier secured his starting position for Stuttgart, forming a central defense partnership with either Delpierre or Tasci. He helped the side progress to the UEFA Europa League Group Stage after beating Molde and Slovan Bratislava in the qualifying round. Niedermeier then scored his first goal of the season, in a 7–0 win against Borussia Mönchengladbach on 18 September 2010. A month later on 24 October 2010, he scored his second goal of the season, in a 2–0 win against St. Pauli. After missing one match due to an injury, Niedermeier scored on his return, in a 6–0 win against Werder Bremen on 7 November 2010. A month later on 10 December 2010, he scored his third goal of the season, in a 2–1 loss against Hannover 96. Following multiple changes in coaching positions, Stuttgart's performance in the first half of the season was disappointing, collecting only 12 points and sitting last in the league. Despite this, Niedermeier's efforts contributed to the clubs' qualification for the UEFA Europa League knockout stage after finishing at the top of the group stage table. On 15 January 2011, Niedermeier returned to the first team, coming on as a late substitute, in a 1–0 win against Mainz 05. He continued to consolidate his starting XI place later in the 2010–11 season, only missing one game due to suspension. Niedermeier scored his fifth goal of the season, in a 1–1 draw against Wolfsburg on 20 March 2011. His performances, under Head Coach Bruno Labbadia, secured Stuttgart's place in the Bundesliga. Despite a turbulent season, VfB Stuttgart finished in 12th place. At the end of the 2010–11 season, Niedermeier made forty–two appearances, scoring five times in all competitions. This showcase earned him the title of the most dangerous central defender for the Bundesliga season 2010-11.

Ahead of the 2011–12 season, Niedermeier suffered a knee injury during a friendly match against Stuttgarter Kickers. It was announced on 25 July 2011 that he would be out for two months following an operation on his leg injury. By September, Niedermeier made his recovery from his injury and returned to training to regain his fitness. He then returned to the first team against FC Augsburg on 20 November 2011, starting the whole game, in a 2–1 win. Since returning from injury, Niedermeier regained his first team place, playing in the centre–back position. However during a 4–1 win against SC Freiburg on 27 February 2012, he suffered an injury and was substituted in the 66th minute. After the match, it was revealed that Niedermeier's injury was not serious as it was first thought and "showed no fractures in the rib area". Niedermeier then captained the side for the first time in his career, as he helped Stuttgart win 2–1 against TSG 1899 Hoffenheim on 16 March 2012. Niedermeier followed up the next two matches as captain, coming against 1. FC Nürnberg and Borussia Dortmund. At the end of the 2011–12 season, he made nineteen appearances in all competitions.

At the start of the 2012–13 season, Niedermeier started the season well when he set up the club's first goal of the game, in a 5–0 win against SV Falkensee-Finkenkrug in the first round of the DFB–Pokal. Since the start of the 2012–13 season, he continued to retain his starting XI place, playing on the centre–back position. Playing his first game of the Europa League group stage of the season, Niedermeier scored his first goal in a 2–2 draw against Steaua București. In a follow–up match against Werder Bremen on 23 September 2012, he played in a striker role after coming on for Shinji Okazaki and set up a goal for Cacau to make it 2–2, which was the final result. Niedermeier then helped the club progress through the UEFA Europa League knockout stage. It was announced on 9 January 2013 that Niedermeier extended his contract with VfB Stuttgart, keeping him until June 2016. On 17 March 2013, he scored his second goal of the season, the winning goal in a 2–1 win against Eintracht Frankfurt. However in a follow–up match against Borussia Dortmund, Niedermeier was sent–off for a second bookable offence, in a 2–1 loss. After serving a one match suspension, he returned to the starting line–up, helping VfB Stuttgart win 2–0 against Borussia Mönchengladbach. In a follow–up match against SC Freiburg, Niedermeier helped the side win 2–1 to qualify for the DFB–Pokal Final. In the DFB-Pokal Final against Bayern Munich, Niedermeier was part of the starting XI, as VfB Stuttgart lost 3–2. Despite being sidelined on five occasions during the 2012–13 season, he made forty appearances and scoring two times in all competitions. VfB Stuttgart ended the season on 12th place, but would be able to qualify for the Europe-League once again due to their final achievement in the DFB-Pokal.

At the start of the 2013–14 season, however, Niedermeier suffered a knee injury during the second leg of the UEFA Europa League third round against Botev Plovdiv and was substituted in the 64th minute, as VfB Stuttgart drew 0–0, resulting in their elimination from the tournament through away goal following a 1–1 draw in the first leg. After rehabilitating end of September, he returned to the starting line–up on 25 October 2013 , in a 1–1 draw against 1. FC Nürnberg. However, Niedermeier's poor performance later in 2013 led him being dropped to the substitute bench. But following the crisis of the club's defence, he returned to the starting line–up as captain, as VfB Stuttgart lost 4–1 against TSG 1899 Hoffenheim. Niedermeier captained the side in a follow–up match against Hertha BSC, as the side lost 2–1. On 15 March 2014, he scored his first goal of the season, in a 1–1 draw against Werder Bremen. However, in a 3–2 loss against Borussia Dortmund on 29 March 2014, Niedermeier was sent–off in the 67th minute for unsportsmanlike conduct. Despite the sending off, he continued to regain his first team place under new Coach Huub Stevens for the rest of the 2013–14 season and helped the Club to stay in the Bundesliga after a turbulent season. Niedermeier went on to make twenty appearances and scoring once in all competitions.

However at the start of the 2014–15 season, Niedermeier found himself under new Coach Armin Veh behind the pecking order, which saw him placed on the substitute bench, as well as, his own injury concern. On 24 September 2014, he made his first appearance of the season, coming on as a 79th-minute substitute, in a 2–2 draw against Borussia Dortmund. Niedermeier then set up the club's fourth goal of the game, in a 5–4 win against Eintracht Frankfurt on 25 October 2014. In a follow–up match against Wolfsburg, Niedermeier was at fault when he gave the club's third goal of the game, in a 4–0 win. Shortly after, Niedermeier suffered a thigh injury in a duel that kept him out for a month. On 13 December 2014, Niedermeier returned to the starting line–up, in a 1–1 draw against Mainz 05. However three days later on 16 December 2014, he was sent–off in the 53rd minute for an unsportsmanlike conduct, in a 1–0 win against Hamburger SV. After serving a one match suspension, Niedermeier returned to the starting line–up, in a 1–0 loss against Borussia Mönchengladbach on 31 January 2015. Since returning from suspension, he regained his starting XI place for the rest of the 2014–15 season, playing in the centre–back position. On 20 February 2015 against Borussia Dortmund Niedermeier captained the side, scored his first goal of the season and set up the club's first goal of the game, in a 3–2 loss. At the end of the 2014–15 season, he made twenty–two appearances and scoring once in all competitions.

At the start of the 2015–16 season, however, Niedermeier, once again, found himself behind the pecking order, which saw him placed on the substitute bench, as well as, his own injury concern. On 29 November 2015, Niedermeier made his first appearance of the season against Borussia Dortmund, starting the whole game, and scored his first own goal of his career, in a 4–1 loss. Two weeks later on 16 December 2015, he scored his first goal of the season, in an important 3–2 win against Eintracht Braunschweig in the DFB-Pokal. Since returning to the starting line-up, Niedermeier regained his starting XI spot for the rest of the 2015–16 season. He then scored his second goal of the season, as well as, setting up the club's third goal of the game, in a 4–2 win against Eintracht Frankfurt on 6 February 2016. A month later on 5 March 2016, Niedermeier scored twice for the side, in a 5–1 win against TSG 1899 Hoffenheim. After serving a one match suspension, Niedermeier returned to the starting line–up against Bayern Munich on 9 April 2016, which he scored his second own goal, in a 3–1 loss. A month later on 2 May 2016, Niedermeier captained the side once again, as they lost 6–2 against Werder Bremen. However, VfB Stuttgart were relegated after a miserable start of the campaign under coach Alexander Zorniger after losing 3–1 to Wolfsburg on 14 May 2016. At the end of the 2015–16 season, he made twenty appearances and scoring four times in all competitions.

It was announced on 30 May 2016 that Niedermeier would depart the club. Prior to his release, there was an article published by Stuttgarter Zeitung on whether he deserved to have his contract renewed by VfB Stuttgart despite his mixed popularity among supporters.

SC Freiburg

On 31 August 2016, free agent Niedermeier signed a contract with Bundesliga side SC Freiburg.

He made his SC Freiburg debut, coming on as a 78th-minute substitute, in a 3–0 loss against 1. FC Köln on 16 September 2016. After a good start into the 2016–17 season, Niedermeier continued to make three more starts for the side. However, he picked up a long lasting back injury in a training session in early October forcing him to watch most of the first and after a short comeback in January even the second half of the season from the stands. Nonetheless, Niedermeier proved to be a relentless motivator and coaches as well as the club officials honored his role. The team finished 7th in the season, giving them the opportunity to play UEFA Europe League Qualification the following season. At the end of the 2016–17 season, Niedermeier made seven appearances in all competitions.

Ahead of the 2017–18 season, however, Freiburg turned into a challenge for Niedermeier as Club politics changed massively when his move to later Bundesliga-side Union Berlin couldn't be finalized. Due to his salary and the fact that young players surprised the year before, Niedermeier was cut of the team in order to force a move. Later, an unknown assailant burned Niedermeier's Mercedes AMG down in front of his apartment. At the end of the 2017–18 season he left the club.

Melbourne Victory

In 2018 Niedermeier moved to Australia joining A-League powerhouse Melbourne Victory and European veterans Keisuke Honda, Olá Toivonen and Raul Baena after passing his medical on 24 July 2018.

Niedermeier made his A-League debut, in Victory's opening game of the 2018–19 A-League in the Melbourne Derby on 20 October 2018. He would make four more starts in the next four matches for the side. Picking up two concussions and a mid-foot ligament sprain in duels in the following weeks after a good start of the campaign, he scored his first, the winning goal, in a 2–1 win against Central Coast Mariners on 14 April 2019, leading Victory into the finals. Although he returned to the first team on three separate occasions, coming on as a late substitute, Niedermeier was sent–off in the 15th minute following a second bookable offence, in a 1–1 draw against rivals, Melbourne City on 23 February 2019. Niedermeier helped Melbourne Victory finishing third in the regular season allowing them to take part in the 2018–19 Finals series. It was once again Niedermeier scoring the opening goal in the elimination final home win against Wellington Phoenix at AAMI Park on 3 May 2019, but two weeks later Melbourne Victory pulled short against later Champions Sydney FC at Jubilee Oval. At the end of the 2018–19 season, Niedermeier made 19 appearances and scored two goals in all competitions.

On 28 May 2019, Melbourne Victory announced that Niedermeier would depart the club following the conclusion of the 2018–19 A-League season. Following this, he returned to Germany to maintain his fitness with Bayern Munich's reserve in hopes of finding a new club.

International career
Niedermeier played for Germany U17 national team, winning fourteen caps.

Career statistics

Honours
Bayern Munich II
IFA Shield: 2005

References

External links
 
 

1986 births
Living people
German footballers
Germany youth international footballers
Association football defenders
FC Bayern Munich II players
FC Bayern Munich footballers
VfB Stuttgart players
SC Freiburg players
Melbourne Victory FC players
Bundesliga players
3. Liga players
Regionalliga players
A-League Men players
German expatriate footballers
Expatriate soccer players in Australia
Footballers from Munich